Johnny White (born February 3, 1988) is a former American football running back. White played college football for the North Carolina Tar Heels. He was drafted by the Buffalo Bills in the 5th round, 133rd Overall in the 2011 NFL Draft.

Early years
White attended Asheville High School in Asheville, North Carolina. He started just two seasons at tailback and rushed for 5,133 yards to break a 63-year-old school record previously held by legendary Carolina back Charlie "Choo-Choo" Justice. He rushed for 1,855 yards on 207 carries and scored 31 touchdowns as a senior. Also had 10 catches for 150 yards and a touchdown. Rushed for 55 yards despite an injured ankle in Asheville's 13-10 victory over Western Alamance in the 2005 3-A state championship game. He was named the Asheville Citizen-Times All-Western North Carolina Player of the Year.

Considered a three-star recruit by Rivals.com, he was ranked the nation's No. 11 all-purpose back. He committed to North Carolina over other scholarship offers from South Carolina and Arkansas.

College career
After redshirting in 2006, White rushed for 399 yards on 95 carries as a redshirt freshman in 2007. He also caught 15 passes for 159 yards. In 2008, he played cornerback for the first seven games before returning to running back where he played in 2007. He also led the team with 379 kickoff return yards and had a 25.3 average per return. In 2009, he played primarily on offense and special teams. He rushed for 143 yards and a score on 19 carries and caught seven passes for 66 yards and a TD on the season.

As a senior in 2010, Johnny White was converted back to running back for the Tar Heels. White was on pace to surpass the 1,000 yard rushing mark during the 2010 season, but his season was cut short to an injury. He finished his season with 130 carries for 720 yards and seven touchdowns, all team highs. He also had 24 receptions for 288 yards.

Professional career

Buffalo Bills
Considered a mid-round pick by NFL scouts, White was selected by the Buffalo Bills in the 5th round, 133rd Overall in 2011 NFL Draft.

Green Bay Packers
On October 15, 2012, White was claimed off waivers by the Green Bay Packers after the Packers' running back depth was decreasing due to the team having to place two players on the injured reserve list in as many weeks.  White was placed on Injured Reserve by the Packers on December 5, 2012 to make room for veteran running back Ryan Grant.  White was released with an injury settlement on December 27, 2012.

References

1988 births
Living people
American football running backs
Buffalo Bills players
North Carolina Tar Heels football players
Sportspeople from Asheville, North Carolina
Players of American football from North Carolina
Green Bay Packers players